Denise Brown (born 1 May 1955) is a British athlete. She competed in the women's high jump at the 1976 Summer Olympics.

References

1955 births
Living people
Athletes (track and field) at the 1976 Summer Olympics
British female high jumpers
Olympic athletes of Great Britain
Place of birth missing (living people)